Isaiah Benjamin Montell Jones (born 26 June 1999) is an English professional footballer who plays as a wing-back and winger for Middlesbrough.

Career
Jones joined Middlesbrough in the summer of 2019 alongside right-back Sam Folarin after helping Tooting & Mitcham to a 6th-place finish in the Isthmian South Central Division.

After scoring 3 goals in 3 appearances in the Premier League 2 during December 2019, Jones was nominated for the PL2 player of the month award, losing out to Tahith Chong of Manchester United.

On 31 January 2020, Jones joined Scottish Premiership club St Johnstone on loan until the end of the season. He made his debut for the club on 8 February 2020 in the Scottish Cup, coming on as a late substitute against Ayr United, which St. Johnstone won 1–2 at Somerset Park.

He made his first-team debut for Middlesbrough in the FA Cup in January 2021, coming on as a late substitute in a 2-1 defeat away to Brentford. Later that month, on 29 January 2021, Jones joined Scottish Championship club Queen of the South on loan until the end of the season. On his debut for the club, he scored his first senior goal in the 2–1 defeat away at Alloa Athletic.

He made his English Football League debut on the opening day of the 2021–22 season, coming on as a substitute in a 1-1 draw away to Fulham, and earned his first start for Middlesbrough a few days later in a 3-0 defeat away to Blackpool in the EFL Cup. He signed a new contract in November 2021, until the summer of 2025. After scoring his first senior goal in a 1–0 win against Swansea City, registering both assists in a 2–1 win over Blackpool and winning the game-deciding penalty against AFC Bournemouth as well as registering four clean sheets, Jones was awarded the EFL Championship Player of the Month award for December 2021 with his newly appointed manager Chris Wilder winning the Manager of the Month award.

Playing style
Originally a winger, Jones can also play as a wing-back.

Career statistics

Honours
Individual
EFL Championship Player of the Month: December 2021

References

1999 births
Living people
Footballers from Lambeth
English footballers
Association football wingers
Association football fullbacks
Tooting & Mitcham United F.C. players
Middlesbrough F.C. players
St Johnstone F.C. players
Queen of the South F.C. players
Isthmian League players
Scottish Professional Football League players
English Football League players
Black British sportspeople